Nathan Hill is an American fiction writer. He won the 2016 Art Seidenbaum Award for First Fiction of the Los Angeles Times Book Prize for his novel The Nix.

Early life and education
Hill was born in Cedar Rapids, Iowa, and grew up all over the Midwest, where his grandparents had worked as corn, soybean and cattle farmers. His family moved constantly when he was growing up — around Illinois, Missouri, Oklahoma, and Kansas — as his father worked his way up through management at Kmart.

References

External links 
 Official website
 6 questions for The Nix author Nathan Hill, atlantamagazine.com

21st-century American novelists
American male novelists
Living people
Novelists from Iowa
Date of birth missing (living people)
21st-century American male writers
Year of birth missing (living people)